The 1999–2000 Oklahoma State Cowboys basketball team represented Oklahoma State University as a member of the Big 12 Conference during the 1999–2000 NCAA Division I men's basketball season. They were led by 10th-year head coach Eddie Sutton and played their home games at Gallagher-Iba Arena in Stillwater, Oklahoma. They finished the season 27–7, 12–4 in Big 12 play to finish in a tie for third place. The Cowboys lost to Iowa State in the semifinals of the Big 12 tournament. The team received an at-large bid to the NCAA tournament as the No. 3 seed in the East region. Oklahoma State reached the Elite Eight after wins over Hofstra, Pepperdine, and Seton Hall, but lost in the regional final to Florida.

Roster

Source:

Schedule and results

|-
!colspan=9 style=| Regular season

|-
!colspan=9 style=| Big 12 Tournament

|-
!colspan=9 style=| NCAA Tournament

Rankings

2000 NBA draft

References

Oklahoma State Cowboys basketball seasons
Oklahoma State
1999 in sports in Oklahoma
2000 in sports in Oklahoma
Oklahoma State